American Epic is a film series by Bernard MacMahon.

American Epic may also refer to:
American Epic (film series), a 2017 documentary series by Bernard MacMahon
American Epic: The Soundtrack, a 2017 soundtrack to the documentary series
The American Epic Sessions, an award-winning 2017 film by Bernard MacMahon
Music from The American Epic Sessions: Original Motion Picture Soundtrack, a 2017 soundtrack to the film The American Epic Sessions
American Epic: The First Time America Heard Itself, a 2017 book based on the film series
American Epic: The Collection, a 2017 album set based on the film series
American Epic: The Best of Blues
American Epic: The Best of Country
American Epic: The Best of Mississippi John Hurt
American Epic: The Best of The Carter Family
American Epic: The Best of Lead Belly
American Epic: The Best of Blind Willie Johnson
American Epic: The Best of the Memphis Jug Band

See also
America, an Epic Rhapsody, an orchestral work by Ernest Bloch
The Epic of American Civilization, a mural by José Clemente Orozco
National epic, any literary work that expresses the spirit or essence of a nation